Ekkehard (and Eckardt, Eckard, Eckart, Eckhardt, Ekkehart) is a German given name. It is composed of the elements ekke "edge, blade; sword" and hart "brave; hardy". Variant forms include Eckard, Eckhard, Eckhart, Eckart.
The Anglo-Saxon form of the name was Ecgheard, possibly attested in the toponym Eggerton.

Middle Ages
It was the name of five monks of the Abbey of Saint Gall from the tenth to the thirteenth century:
Ekkehard I (died 973)
Ekkehard II (died 990)
Ekkehard III  
Ekkehard IV (died c. 1056)
Ekkehard V (died c. 1220)

It was also the name of two Margraves of Meissen:
Eckard I (died 1002)
Eckard II (died 1046)

Other notable people with that given name include:
Ekkehard of Huysburg (died 1084), abbot of Huysburg Abbey
Ekkehard of Aura (died 1126), chronicler and abbot of Aura Abbey
Meister Eckhart (died c. 1327), philosopher and mystic
Eckhard Christian (1907-1985), Luftwaffe officer
Ekkehard von Kuenssberg (1913–2000), German doctor 
Eckhard Pfeiffer (b. 1941), businessman

See also
Ekkehard,  1878 opera by Johann Joseph Abert inspired by Ekkehard II of Saint Gall

German masculine given names